Le Château  is a quartier of Saint Barthélemy in the Caribbean. It is located in the northern part of the island. The airport runway is located nearby.

See also
 Gustaf III Airport

Populated places in Saint Barthélemy
Quartiers of Saint Barthélemy